Bad Life may refer to:
 Bad Life (Public Image Ltd song)
 Bad Life (Sigrid and Bring Me the Horizon song)

See also
 The Bad Life, a 2005 French novel by Frédéric Mitterrand
 The Bad Life (film), a 1973 Argentine crime film